is a former Japanese football player.

Playing career
Kaneko was born in Ota, Tokyo on May 29, 1982. He joined J1 League club Yokohama F. Marinos from youth team in 2000. He debuted in November 2000 and his opportunity to play increased in 2001. However he could hardly play in the match from 2002. In August 2004, he moved to J2 League club Consadole Sapporo. He became a regular player as defensive midfielder in summer 2005. However his opportunity to play decreased from 2006 and he retired end of 2007 season.

Club statistics

References

External links

1982 births
Living people
Association football people from Tokyo
Japanese footballers
J1 League players
J2 League players
Yokohama F. Marinos players
Hokkaido Consadole Sapporo players
Association football midfielders